is a passenger railway station located in Sakai-ku, Sakai, Osaka Prefecture, Japan, operated by the private railway operator Nankai Electric Railway. It has the station number "NK11".

Lines

Layout
The station consists of two elevated island platforms serving four tracks are located on the third level. Ticket gates are located in the center and the south; the center gates are connected with the east and west exits, and the south gates are with the south gate.

Platforms

Adjacent stations

Surrounding area
East
Station building
PLATPLAT (shopping mall by Nankai Railway)  
Nankai Bus Terminal (Sakai-ekimae)
West
Hotel Agora Regency Sakai
Portas Sakai
Round 1 (entertainment facility)
Takemoto Piano
Bus Terminal (Sakai-eki nishiguchi)
South
Shop Nankai
Nankai Bus Terminal (Sakai-eki minamiguchi)
Ryujin District

Buses
Sakai-ekimae (Nankai Bus)
for Oshoji and -ekimae
for Hanwa -ekimae and -ekimae
for Shukuin and Higashi-Minato
for Dejima and Sakai City Hospital
for Dejima and Kogyo-gakkko-mae (Osaka Prefectural Sakai Technology High School)
for Intex Osaka, Asia & Pacific Trade Center and Osaka Prefectural Government Sakishima Building
Expressway buses for Shinjuku and Tokyo
Expressway buses for Takeo Onsen, Sasebo and Huis Ten Bosch
Expressway buses for Odawara, Fujisawa, Kamakura, Ofuna and Totsuka
Expressway buses for Kashiwazaki, Nagaoka and Sanjo
Expressway buses for Yokohama, Tokyo Disney Resort, Nishi-Funabashi and Makuhari
Sakai-eki nishiguchi
for J-GREEN Sakai (Nankai Bus)
for Sakaihama Seaside Stage (Nankai Bus)
for Takumicho (Sharp Sakai Factory) (Nankai Bus)
for Hanwa Sakaishi-ekimae (Nankai Bus)
Kansai Airport limousine "Sorae" for Kansai Airport (Nankai Bus)
Sakai-eki minamiguchi (Nankai Bus)
for Kanaoka
for 
for 
for Shukuin and Oshoji
for Dejima and Sakai City Hospital
for Dejima and Kogyo-gakkko-mae (Osaka Prefectural Sakai Technology High School)

History
Sakai Station opened on 15 May 1888. At the time, it was also called . On 20 December 1912  opened between Sakai and Minato stations. The station burned down on July 10, 1945 during American air raids on Sakai in World War II. On 21 April 1955 Sakai Station and Ryujin Station were combined, with the new Sakai Station located on the site of the former Ryujin Station. The tracks were elevated between 1983 and 1985 and the new station building was completed in 1997.

Passenger statistics
In fiscal 2019, the station was used by an average of 38,758 passengers daily.

See also
 List of railway stations in Japan

References

External links

  

Railway stations in Japan opened in 1888
Railway stations in Osaka Prefecture
Sakai, Osaka